Justin Mulenga (27 February 1955 – 20 March 2020) was a Zambian Roman Catholic bishop.

Mulenga was born in Zambia and was ordained to the priesthood in 1993. He served as bishop of the Roman Catholic Diocese of Mpika, Zambia, from 2017 until his death in 2020.

Notes

1955 births
2020 deaths
Zambian Roman Catholic bishops
Roman Catholic bishops of Mpika